Nigel Parry is a New York-based photographer of celebrities, who started his career in London in 1987 and moved to New York in 1994. His work has been seen in magazine features, such as Elle, InStyle, Vanity Fair, Men's Health and Maxim. His clients further include major movie and music companies, including 20th Century Fox, Buena Vista Pictures, Sony Music and Bad Boy Records. He is also ambassador for Operation Smile

He directed the Charlie Mars music video Meet Me By The Backdoor (2009).

Publications 
 Nigel Parry: Sharp (2000)
 Nigel Parry, Melanie Dunea: Precious (2004)
 NIgel Parry: Blunt (2006)

External links
 Nigel Parry Photo - Official Website
 Creative Photographers inc.
 photographerslimitededitions - Online Gallery
  - Sue Allatt Creative

Photographers from New York City
Living people
Year of birth missing (living people)